Luigi Manzotti (2 February 1835 – 15 March 1905) was an Italian mime dancer and choreographer.

Born in Milan, Manzotti created his first ballet in 1858 and his subsequent productions were performed around the world. Today he is best remembered for his choreography of the ballet  Excelsior (1881), music by Romualdo Marenco.

References

External links

1905 deaths
Italian choreographers
1835 births
Ballet choreographers